Glomerales is an order of symbiotic fungi within the phylum Glomeromycota.

Biology 
These fungi are all biotrophic mutualists. Most employ the arbuscular mycorrhizal method of nutrient exchange with plants. They produce large (.1-.5mm) spores (azygospores and chlamydospores) with thousands of nuclei.

Phylogeny 
All members of their phylum were once thought to be related to the Endogonaceae, but have been found through molecular sequencing data, to be a closer relation to the Dikarya. Their fossil record extends back to the Ordovician period (460 million years ago).

Orthography 
The family name Glomeraceae upon which this order level name is based, was incorrectly spelled 'Glomaceae', hence the order name was incorrectly spelled 'Glomales'. Both are correctable errors, to Glomeraceae and Glomerales, as governed by the International Code of Botanical Nomenclature. The incorrect spellings are commonplace in the literature, unfortunately.

See also 
 Glomalin

References 

 
Fungus orders